This is the list of the Singaporean drama Kinship's episodes. Copyright to MediaCorp TV Channel 8.

Episode list

Part 1: June — August

Part 2

References
Kinship Episodes

Singapore Chinese dramas
Lists of Singaporean television series episodes